The 2010–11 Swiss Challenge League was the eighth season of the Swiss Challenge League, the second tier of the Swiss football league pyramid. It began on 23 July 2010 and ended on 25 May 2011. The champions of this season, FC Lausanne-Sport, earned promotion to the 2011–12 Super League. The runners-up Servette won the promotion/relegation playoff against the 9th-placed team of the 2010–11 Super League, AC Bellinzona. The bottom two teams, FC Schaffhausen and Yverdon-Sport FC, were relegated to the 1. Liga.

Teams
2009–10 Challenge League champions FC Thun were promoted to the 2010–11 Super League. They were replaced by FC Aarau, who were relegated after finishing the 2009–10 Super League in last place. 2009–10 Challenge League runners-up FC Lugano had to compete in a promotion/relegation playoff against 9th-placed Super League team AC Bellinzona and eventually retained their league spot after losing 1–2 on aggregate.

FC Le Mont as 15th-placed team and last-placed FC Gossau were relegated after the 2009–10 season. They were replaced by FC Chiasso and SR Delémont, who emerged victorious from the eight-team 1. Liga promotion playoff.

League table

Results

Top goalscorers
Including matches played on 21 May 2011; Source: Swiss Football League

18 goals
 Michaël Rodriguez (SR Delémont)

17 goals
 Bruno Valente (FC Schaffhausen)

16 goals
 Dante Senger (FC Lugano)

15 goals
 Silvio Carlos (FC Lausanne-Sport)
 Eudis (Servette FC)

14 goals
 Jocelyn Roux (FC Lausanne-Sport)

13 goals
 Marcos De Azevedo (Servette FC)

12 goals
 Frédéric Besseyre (FC Stade Nyonnais)
 Franck Etoundi (FC Biel-Bienne)

11 goals
 Dzengis Cavusevic (FC Wil 1900)
 Sabiá (FC Vaduz)
 Moreno Merenda (FC Vaduz)
 Alain Schultz (FC Wohlen)
 Aco Stojkov (FC Aarau)

References

External links
 Official site (in German)

Swiss Challenge League seasons
2010–11 in Swiss football
Swiss

de:Schweizer Fussballmeisterschaft 2010/11#Challenge League